The Senator Joseph A. Sullivan Trophy, named in honour of Joseph Albert Sullivan, is presented annually to the outstanding ice hockey player (Player of the Year) in U Sports, the governing body for Canadian university athletics.

While studying to be a doctor at the University of Toronto in the 1920s, Sullivan was the goaltender for the Toronto Varsity Blues. He played with a team of graduates from the Blues representing Canada at the 1928 Winter Olympics in St. Moritz, where the team won the Gold Medal.

Like Sullivan, the fourth recipient of the Trophy, Randy Gregg of the Alberta Golden Bears, was also earning a medical degree while he played university hockey. In 1990, the Dr. Randy Gregg Award was created, honoring the U Sports ice hockey player who has exhibited outstanding achievement in ice hockey, academics, and community involvement.

List of winners
A table of the winners of the annual Senator Joseph A. Sullivan Trophy.

References

U Sports ice hockey trophies and awards